Sokolniki  is a village in the administrative district of Gmina Udanin, within Środa Śląska County, Lower Silesian Voivodeship, in south-western Poland.

The name of the village is of Polish origin and comes from the word sokół, which means "falcon".

References

Villages in Środa Śląska County